Arno Küttel (born 20 December 1963) is a Swiss former professional racing cyclist. He notably won a stage of the 1989 Tour de Suisse and the 1995 European Motor-paced Championships. He also won the bronze medal at the 1991 UCI Motor-paced World Championships.

Major results

1982
 1st Chur–Arosa
1983
 2nd Chur–Arosa
1984
 2nd Chur–Arosa
1985
 1st  Road race, National Amateur Road Championships
 1st Schynberg Rundfahrt
 3rd Giro del Lago Maggiore
 3rd Chur–Arosa
1986
 1st Chur–Arosa
 3rd Overall GP Tell
 3rd Schynberg Rundfahrt
1987
 2nd Chur–Arosa
 4th Tre Valli Varesine
 5th Gran Premio Città di Camaiore
 6th Coppa Placci
1988
 1st Overall Grabs–Voralp
1st Stage 1a
 1st Visp–Grächen
1989
 1st Stage 4 Tour de Suisse
 1st Chur–Arosa
 6th Tour du Nord-Ouest
1990
 3rd Time trial, National Road Championships
1991
 3rd  UCI Motor-paced World Championships
1993
 1st  National Motor-paced Championships
1995
 1st  European Motor-paced Championships

References

External links

1963 births
Living people
Swiss male cyclists
People from Bremgarten, Aargau
Swiss track cyclists
Sportspeople from Aargau
Tour de Suisse stage winners